A sound card mixer is the analog part of a sound card that routes and mixes sound signals. This circuit receives inputs from both external connectors and the sound card's digital-to-analog converters. It selects or mutes, amplifies (with variable gain) these signals, adds them together, and finally routes the result to both external output connectors and the sound card's analog-to-digital converters. Different mixing schemes are in use, but the ones implemented in most IBM-PC compatible computers today are variants of a scheme defined in Intel's AC'97 Audio Component Specification.

Mixer controls 
Sound card mixer controls are provided through the GUI interface in the computer's operating system. On most desktop environments, the mixer can be accessed via a Volume icon in the system tray.

Mixer controls are similar to that of a mixing console. They consist of volume sliders or rotary controls that represent each individual source, which may be accompanied by balance and mute controls. Most interfaces provide a method of switching between playback (output) sources and recording (input) sources. Additional hardware or software may add other effects such as low-pass filters, distortion and boost controls.

Mixing scheme 
The following schematic shows a greatly simplified example of how some sound card's mixers manipulate sound from different sources:

A more accurate depiction of the mixing scheme used in AC'97 compatible sound cards can be seen in Figure 17 of the AC'97 spec.

Typical input channels and controls 
Each of the following signal sources has its own gain and mute control in a typical mixer scheme:

Typical output channels and controls 
Each of the following signal destinations has its own gain and mute control in a typical mixer scheme:

Typical record controls 
In a typical AC’97 style mixer scheme, the analog-to-digital converters that allow the CPU to receive audio signal can either be connected directly to one of each of the inputs, or they can be connected to the same summation result that the mixer can provide via the line, aux and mono analog outputs. Therefore, in addition to the above input and output gain controls, a mixer also provides a number of controls for selecting the recording source. The result of this selection is again subject to a mute and gain control before it is digitized.

References

Sound cards